Yongfeng is a town in Shuangfeng County, Hunan, People's Republic of China. 

The Chinese government in 2007 approved an application for Geographical Indication Products status for Yongfeng chili sauce, specifying the ingredients and their proportions for industrial production.

Administrative division
The town is divided into 49 villages and 14 communities.

References

Divisions of Shuangfeng County
County seats in Hunan